The LR-101 is a fixed thrust, single start vernier thruster developed by Rocketdyne in the mid-to-late fifties and used in the Atlas, Thor and Delta launch vehicles until 1990.

Each of these rockets used two LR-101 secondary engines to provide yaw, pitch and roll control during their ascent to space. The pair of LR-101 vernier thrusters would receive their propellant flow from the turbopumps of the sustainer engine until it was shut off.
After sustainer burnout, this pair of thrusters would switch to feed off the remaining propellant, effectively becoming a Pressure-fed engine. The remaining fuel would then be spent for the last trajectory corrections and stabilization of the rocket before separating the payload.

Variants 

Due to several modifications the LR-101 underwent over the years, there are many different variants of this engine. One of the first changes was the downrating of the engine to a lower thrust level, both because the engine provided far more thrust than required to steer the rocket and to save fuel for the main engines. Another major change was the replacement of the original pyrotechnical ignition system with an igniter using a hypergolic fuel mixture composed of Triethylaluminum and Triethylborane.
Additionally, the Atlas, Thor and Delta Rockets each possessed unique aerodynamically shielded gimbal mounts in the vicinity of their primary engines to provide large arcs for the vernier thrusters.
While the pair of LR-101s on the Atlas was mounted radially above the booster engines of the vehicle, on the Thor they were placed at the base of the vehicle.

Role in experimental rocketry 

The LR-101 is one of the most common vernier thrusters utilized in US-American rocketry and has become a sought-after object for item collectors and builders of amateur spacecraft.
Rocket engineer Robert C. Truax, who had led the initial design studies for the PGM-17 Thor missile had planned on propelling his 'X-3 Volksrocket' with four Rocketdyne LR-101 Engines, but despite many test firings the rocket never left the ground.

On the 'Galactic Aztec', the engine used RP-2 (Kerosene) as a propellant instead of RP-1, which was utilized in the SM-65 Atlas and PGM-17 Thor ICBMs as well as the later commercial Delta Rockets.

See also
SM-65 Atlas - The first rocket to use the LR-101
Rocketdyne - The designer bureau of the LR-101

References

External links

Rocket engines using kerosene propellant
Rocketdyne engines
North American Aviation
Rocket engines using the pressure-fed cycle
Rocket engines of the United States
Spacecraft components
Spacecraft attitude control